The epithet "Bavarian Geographer" is the conventional name for the anonymous author of a short Latin medieval text containing a list of the tribes in Central-Eastern Europe, headed .

The name "Bavarian Geographer" was first bestowed (in its French form, "") in 1796 by Polish count and scholar Jan Potocki. The term is now also used at times to refer to the document itself.

It was the first Latin source to claim that all Slavs have originated from the same homeland, called the Zeriuani.

Origin and content 

The short document, written in Latin, was discovered in 1772 in the Bavarian State Library, Munich by Louis XV's ambassador to the Saxon court, Comte Louis-Gabriel Du Buat-Nançay. It had been acquired by the Wittelsbachs with the collection of the antiquarian Hermann Schädel (1410–85) in 1571. The document was much discussed in the early 19th-century historiography, notably by Nikolai Karamzin and Joachim Lelewel.

The provenance of the document is disputed. Based on these findings, Bernhard Bischoff attributes it to a monk active at Reichenau from the 830s to 850s. Aleksandr Nazarenko finds it more probable that the list was composed in the 870s, when Saint Methodius is believed to have resided at Reichenau. The document may have been connected with his missions in the Slavic lands. Henryk Łowmiański demonstrated that the list consists of two parts, which may be datable to different periods and attributed to distinct authors.

In modern times, some scholars attribute the information from this document to be limited, because it is largely geographic in nature, and its understanding of Eastern European geography is limited, so it may be a case of Cosmography.

Content 
The document has a short introductory sentence and a list of 58 tribal names in Central-Eastern Europe, East of the Elbe and North of the Danube to the Volga river to the Black Sea and Caspian Sea (most of them of Slavonic origin, with Ruzzi, and others such as Vulgarii, etc.). Absent on the list are Polans, Pomeranians and  Masovians, tribes first of whom are believed to have settled along the shores of the Warta river during the 8th century, as well Dulebes, Volhynians and White Croats, but instead mentioning several unknown tribes hard to identify. There is also some information about the number of strongholds possessed by some of the tribes, however the number in several instances seems exaggerated. The list consists of two parts, first describing the tribes in the Eastern neighborhood of Francia (iste sunt regiones ... nostris), while the second or near or outside the zone of the first going in different directions. The tribes can be geographically grouped into Danubian, Silesian-Lusatian, Baltic, and Eastern Vistulan-Caspian.

List of tribes 
According to Łowmiański (1958), in the first list are mentioned 1. Nortabtrezi (Obotrites), 2. Uuilci (Veleti), 3. Linaa (Linones), 4.-6.Bethenici-Smeldingon (Smeldingi)-Morizani, 7. Hehfeldi (Hevelli), 8. Surbi (Sorbs/Serbs), 9. Talaminzi (Daleminzi-Glomacze), 10. Beheimare Bohemians, 11. Marharii (Moravians), 12. Uulgarii (Bulgars), 13. Merehanos (Nitra Moravians).

In the second list are mentioned 14. Osterabtrezi (other Obotrites), 15. Miloxi (uncertain), 16. Phesnuzi (unknown), 17. Thadesi (uncertain, Tadeslo), 18. Glopeani (Goplans), 19. Zuireani (uncertain), 20. Busani Buzhans, 21. Sittici (uncertain), 22. Stadici (uncertain), 23. Sebbirozi (uncertain), 24. Unlizi (Ulichs), 25. Neriuani (uncertain), 26. Attorozi (uncertain), 27. Eptaradici (uncertain, Seven Slavic tribes), 28. Uuilerozi (uncertain), 29. Zabrozi (uncertain), 30. Znetalici (Netolice and Neletici), 31. Aturezani (unknown), 32. Chozirozi (uncertain), 33. Lendizi (Lendians), 34. Thafnezi (unknown), 35. Zeriuani (uncertain), 36. Prissani, 37. Uelunzani (Wolinians), 38. Bruzi (Prussians), 39. Uuizunbeire (Volga Bulgaria), 40. Caziri Khazars), 41. Ruzzi (Rus' people), 42.-43. Forsderen-Liudi (uncertain, Drevlians), 44. Fresiti (unknown), 45. Serauici (unknown), 46. Lucolane (uncertain), 47. Ungare (Hungarians), 48. Uuislane (Vistulans), 49. Sleenzane (Silesians), 50. Lunsizi (Lusatians, 51. Dadosesani (Dziadoszanie), 52. Milzane (Milceni), 53. Besunzane (Bežunčani or Pšovans), 54. Uerizane (unknown), 55. Fraganeo (Prague), 56. Lupiglaa (uncertain), 57. Opolini (Opolans), 58. Golensizi.

References

Bibliography 

 Le comte du Buat, T. 11. Paris 1772
 Jan Potocki, Brunsvic 1796
 V. von Keltsch, 23 (1886), s. 507 n.
 A. Králiček,  (1898), pp. 216–235, 340–360
 S. Zakrzewski, Lwów 1917 
 E. Kucharski, Polska w zapisce karolińskiej zwanej niewłaściwie "Geografem bawarskim", [w:] Pamiętnik IV powszechnego Zjazdu historyków polskich, t. I, Lwów 1925, sekcja II, s. 111; 
 E. Kucharski, Zapiska karolińska zwana niewłaściwie "Geografem bawarskim", Sprawozdania Tow. Nauk. we Lwowie, t. V (1925), s. 81–86 
 A. V. Nazarenko. . Moscow, 1993 
 W. Fritze, Die Datierung des Geographus Bavarus, Zschr f. Slavische Philologie, 21, Heft 2 (1952), pp. 326–242 
 Henryk Łowmiański, O pochodzeniu Geografa bawarskiego, Roczniki Historyczne, R. 20, 1955, s. 9–58; reed: w: Studia nad dziejami Słowiańszczyzny, Polski i Rusi w wiekach średnich, Wydawnictwo Naukowe Uniwersytetu im. Adama Mickiewicza, Poznań 1986, s. 104–150,  
 Henryk Łowmiański, O identyfikacji nazw Geografa bawarskiego, Studia Źródłoznawcze, t. III: 1958, s. 1–22; reed: w: Studia nad dziejami Słowiańszczyzny, Polski i Rusi w wiekach średnich, Wydawnictwo Naukowe Uniwersytetu im. Adama Mickiewicza, Poznań 1986, s. 151–181,  
 Gerhard Billig, Zur Rekonstruktion der ältesten slawischen Burgbezirke im obersächsisch-meißnischen Raum auf der Grundlage des Bayerischen Geographen, Neues Archiv für sächsische Geschichte 66 (1995), pp. 27–67 
 Jerzy Nalepa, O nowszym ujęciu problematyki plemion słowiańskich u "Geografa Bawarskiego". Uwagi krytyczne, Slavia Occidentalis, T. 60 (2003), s. 9–6

External links 

Original Latin text in the Bayerische Staatsbibliothek
English translation of text. 

9th-century geographers
Medieval German geographers
9th-century Latin books
Early Slavs
Anonymous works
9th-century manuscripts
Slavic history
Writers from the Carolingian Empire
9th-century Latin writers
Lists of ancient Indo-European peoples and tribes